Setina cantabrica is a moth in the family Erebidae. It was described by Josef J. de Freina and Thomas Joseph Witt in 1985. It is found in Spain.

References

External links
Moths and Butterflies of Europe and North Africa

Moths described in 1985
Endrosina